Mohamed Keshk (born 18 April 1980) is an Egyptian handball player. He competed in the men's tournament at the 2004 Summer Olympics.

References

1980 births
Living people
Egyptian male handball players
Olympic handball players of Egypt
Handball players at the 2004 Summer Olympics